Estonia participated in the XII. Summer Paralympic Games in Athens, Greece. Estonian team representatives were team attaché Estonian Paralympic Committee secretary Liisa Eller, Estonian Paralympic Committee member Are Eller and coaches Kersti Viru, Eric Roots, Heiti Vahtra, Viktor Tkatsenko. Estonian flag bearer at the opening ceremony was Helena Kannus.

Estonia entered 6 athletes in the following sports:

Athletics: 1 female
Powerlifting: 1 male
Shooting: 1 male
Swimming: 1 female and 2 males

Medalists

Sports

Athletics

Powerlifting

Shooting

Swimming 

 Kardo Ploomipuu 
 Men's 100 m Backstroke S10 – Heats: 8th 1.09,80 ; Final: 1.08,99 (→ 8. place )
 Kristo Ringas
 Men's 100 m Breaststroke SB13 – Heats: 11th 1.24,15 (→ did not advance, 11. place )
 Marge Kõrkjas
 Women's 50 m Freestyle S12 – Heats: 2nd 29,28 ; Final: 28,74 (→  Silver Medal )
 Women's 100 m Freestyle S12 – Heats: 6th 1.05,86 ; Final: 1.05,19 (→ 6. place )
 Women's 100 m Butterfly S12 – Heats: 9th 1.23,91 (→ did not advance, 9. place )

See also
2004 Summer Paralympics
Estonia at the Paralympics
Estonia at the 2004 Summer Olympics

External links
International Paralympic Committee
 Estonian Paralympic Committee
Estonian Union of Sports for Disabled page for 2004 Summer Paralympics (in Estonian)

Nations at the 2004 Summer Paralympics
2004
Paralympics